Karol Dobay (2 December 1928 – 20 December 1982) was a former Slovak football striker who played for Dynamo ČSD Košice, Dukla Prague and Jednota Košice. He overall played 152 matches and scored 37 goals during his career at the Czechoslovak First League. He won three league titles for Dukla in 1953, 1956 and 1958.

Dobai made three appearances for the Czechoslovakia national football team and he debuted against Hungary on 14 October 1951.

External links
 Karol Dobai at The Football Association of the Czech Republic
 Hall of Fame Dukla Praha profile

1928 births
1982 deaths
Slovak footballers
Czechoslovak footballers
Czechoslovakia international footballers
Dukla Prague footballers
FC VSS Košice players

Association football forwards